Gemmuloborsonia karubar is a species of sea snail, a marine gastropod mollusk in the family Turridae.

Description
The height of the shell attains 28 mm, its diameter 10.2 mm.

Distribution
This species occurs in the Arafura Sea at depths between 550 m and 620 m; on the continental slope of the Chine Sea.

References

External links
 Sysoev, Alexander, and Philippe Bouchet. "Taxonomic reevaluation of Gemmuloborsonia Shuto, 1989 (Gastropoda: Conoidea), with a description of new Recent deep-water species." Journal of Molluscan Studies 62.1 (1996): 75-87

karubar
Gastropods described in 1996